Chris Lee is the third studio album by Chinese singer Li Yuchun, released on December 22, 2009 by Taihe Rye.

Track listing

Music videos
Let’s Meet at, the Next, Crossing 下个, 路口, 见
Little Kid 小朋友
Amo 阿么
At Least You Have Me 还有我疼你

References

2009 albums
Li Yuchun albums